Chowdhury Kazemuddin Ahmed Siddiky, (1876–1937) was a Bengali Muslim aristocrat and politician during the British Raj. A Khan Bahadur, he was one of the founders of the University of Dacca. He was President of the Eastern Bengal and Assam Muslim League between 1908 and 1912. He was also a member of the governing council of Jagannath College.

Siddiky was fluent in Bengali, English, Urdu, Arabic and Persian.

Social work
Siddiky was an influential social worker in East Bengal, supporting the development of roads, hospitals, dispensaries, water supply, irrigation and orphanages. Because of his social work, the British gifted him with the title 'Khan Bahadur'.

Family
Siddiky was born in 1876 into the landlord family of Baliadi hamlet in Gazipur, central Bengal. He was a descendant of Qutubuddin Koka, one of the early Mughal Viceroys of Bengal. His brother's son Justice Badruddin Ahmed Siddiky was the Chief Justice of the High Court of Dacca and Bangladesh's Permanent Representative to the United Nations in New York. His grandson Chowdhury Tanbir Ahmed Siddiky was a leader of the Bangladesh Nationalist Party (BNP) and a former cabinet minister in Bangladesh. Another grandson Chowdhury Dabir Ahmed Siddiky was President of the Dhaka Club. His great-grandson Chowdhury Irad Ahmed Siddiky was a candidate for the Mayor of Dhaka North in 2015.

References 

19th-century Bengalis
20th-century Bengalis
19th-century Indian Muslims
Social workers
1876 births
1937 deaths
Bangladeshi people of Turkic descent